Manoel Rezende de Mattos Cabral (born July 26, 1950), known as Nelinho, is a former Brazilian association footballer who played as right back. He played for several clubs in his home country and abroad, including Belo Horizonte rivals Cruzeiro and Atlético Mineiro. Nelinho also represented the Brazil national team in two FIFA World Cups.

Club career 
Born in Rio de Janeiro, the son of Portuguese immigrants from Ovar, Nelinho started his career at local club Olaria, but signed his first professional contract with América. After a recommendation by Otto Glória, then manager of the team, he moved to Portugal to play for Barreirense. A brief stint with Venezuela's Deportivo Anzoátegui followed, before returning to Rio de Janeiro to play for Bonsucesso, which then loaned him to Remo. After good performances in the 1972 Brasileirão, Nelinho was signed by Cruzeiro for the following season.

At the Belo Horizonte-based club, Nelinho won the Campeonato Mineiro four times between 1973 and 1977, and one Copa Libertadores in 1976, scoring in two matches of the finals against River Plate. While at the club, he was also selected for the Bola de Prata (Campeonato Brasileiro team of the year) three times, in 1975, 1979 and 1980. In total, he had 411 appearances with Cruzeiro, and scored 105 goals. Nelinho managed Cruzeiro in 1994.

After a brief spell at Grêmio, where he won a Campeonato Gaúcho, Nelinho returned to Belo Horizonte to play for Cruzeiro's rivals Atlético Mineiro in 1982. He spent the rest of his career at the club, where he won four more Campeonato Mineiros and was awarded with the Bola de Prata once more in 1983. He also coached the club in 1993.

International career 
Nelinho was capped 21 times by Brazil, between April 1974 and June 1980, and scored six international goals. He won a Taça do Atlântico with the Seleção, and was part of the squad in two Copa Américas.

Nelinho played three matches in the 1974 FIFA World Cup and four in the 1978 FIFA World Cup, and scored one of the most stunning goals in World Cup history, in the third place match against Italy in 1978: from the right side of the pitch, he struck the ball into the far corner of the goal with the outside of his right foot, bending it around the sprawling Dino Zoff.

Later life 
After retiring from football, Nelinho joined Brazil's Democratic Labour Party and was elected State Deputy of Minas Gerais in 1987. After a period of involvement with politics, he returned briefly to football and managed Atlético Mineiro in 1993 and Cruzeiro in 1994. In 2005, Nelinho worked as pundit for TV Globo and SporTV, and currently owns a health club in Belo Horizonte.

Honours
Cruzeiro
Campeonato Mineiro: 1973, 1974, 1975, 1977
Copa Libertadores: 1976

Grêmio
Campeonato Gaúcho: 1980

Atlético Mineiro
 Campeonato Mineiro: 1982, 1983, 1985, 1986

Brazil
 Taça do Atlântico: 1976

Individual
Bola de Prata: 1975, 1979, 1980, 1983

References

External links

1950 births
Living people
Brazilian footballers
Brazilian expatriate footballers
Brazilian people of Portuguese descent
America Football Club (RJ) players
F.C. Barreirense players
Bonsucesso Futebol Clube players
Clube Atlético Mineiro players
Cruzeiro Esporte Clube players
Grêmio Foot-Ball Porto Alegrense players
Clube do Remo players
Clube Atlético Mineiro managers
Cruzeiro Esporte Clube managers
Campeonato Brasileiro Série A players
Copa Libertadores-winning players
Primeira Liga players
Expatriate footballers in Portugal
Expatriate footballers in Venezuela
Brazilian expatriate sportspeople in Portugal
1974 FIFA World Cup players
1975 Copa América players
1978 FIFA World Cup players
1979 Copa América players
Brazil international footballers
Footballers from Rio de Janeiro (city)
Association football defenders
Brazilian football managers